Mystic Rose or The Mystic Rose may refer to:

Religion and spirituality
 Miracle of the roses in Christian myth and symbolism
 Rosa Mystica, a title in Catholic tradition of Mary, mother of Jesus
 Rosa Mystica apparition, alleged apparition of Mary to Pierina Gilli of Montichiari, Italy, in 1947 and 1966
 Instituto María Rosa Mystica, Sacerdotes Carismáticos Misioneros (Institute of Mary Mystical Rose – Charismatic Missionary Priests), Argentinian Catholic religious association
 Mystic Rose, meditation therapy developed by Rajneesh, aka Osho 
 Mystic Rose, former outer order of the Stella Matutina occult society

Books
 The Mystic Rose, 1885 poetry collection by Stanislas de Guaita
 The Mystic Rose: a study of primitive marriage, 1902 (revised 1927) anthropology book by Ernest Crawley 
 The Mystic Rose, 2001 novel by Stephen R. Lawhead
 The Mystic Rose Garden 14th-century poetry collection by Sheikh Mahmoud Shabestari

Other uses
 Complete graph, in mathematics
 The Mystic Rose, Caroline Webster Schermerhorn Astor's nickname from Ward McAllister

See also
 Rose (symbolism)